The Lalla Meryem Cup is a women's professional golf tournament in Morocco under the high patronage of His Majesty King Mohammed VI. It was held in Rabat until it moved to Agadir in 2011. It moved back to Rabat in 2016.

The tournament has been played annually since 1993 and is held alongside the Hassan II Golf Trophy. In 2010 it was added to the Ladies European Tour schedule and upgraded to a full field tournament having previously been limited to around 12 players. Both tournaments moved to Agadir in 2011.

Winners

Prior to Ladies European Tour co-sanctioning

References

External links

Ladies European Tour

Ladies European Tour events
Golf tournaments in Morocco
Sport in Rabat
Sport in Agadir
Recurring sporting events established in 1993
Spring (season) events in Morocco